Ronald Jean-Martin Agénor (born November 13, 1964) is a former professional tennis player who represented Haiti during his playing career. He is the only Haitian to have ever earned a Top 25 world ranking in singles, reaching a highest singles ranking of world No. 22 in May 1989. During his career he won three ATP tour singles titles.

Early life and junior tennis
Agénor was born on November 13, 1964 in Rabat, Morocco, the son of Frédéric Agénor, a former Haitian Diplomat at the United Nations and Minister of Agriculture of Haiti. He is the youngest of a family of six children and learned how to play tennis in Lubumbashi, Zaire (current Congo) in 1974 and discovered competitive tennis in Bordeaux, France in 1978 under the wing of his brother, Lionel. He was ranked No. 8 junior player in the world in 1982 and won 2 Junior titles Charleroi, Belgium and Monte Carlo, Monaco.

Pro tennis career

Agénor joined the professional tennis circuit in 1983. In 1989 He reached the quarterfinals of the French Open where he was defeated by eventual-champion Michael Chang in four sets, and won his first top-level singles title at Athens. In 1990, Agénor won two further tour singles titles at Berlin and Genoa.

He competed in three Summer Olympic Games, in 1984 (a demonstration event), 1988 and 1996.

In 1999, Agénor finished the year ranked World No. 98 and became the first player aged over 35 to finish in the top-100 since Jimmy Connors in 1992.

Agénor competed in his  penultimate ATP-sanctioned tour event in July 2006 at the Aptos Futures event after a four-year layoff from tour tennis, losing 3–6, 4–6 in the first round.

In a career spanning 19 years, he reached the quarter finals at the French Open in 1989 by beating Carl Limberger, Tim Mayotte, Claudio Pistolesi and Sergi Bruguera before losing to champion Michael Chang. He also got to the fourth round of both the US Open and French Open in 1988. He represented Haiti in the Olympics in Los Angeles in 1984, in Seoul in 1988, and in Atlanta in 1996 and won 3 ATP Tour World titles in Athens, Genoa, and Berlin. At the French Open in 1994, he defeated David Prinosil, 14/12 in the fifth set and broke the previous record of the longest match in the number of games in the history of the French Open since the open era previously held by Emilio Sanchez. In 1987, his final at the Swiss Indoors against Yannick Noah from France, was the first ATP World Tour tennis final between two players of color in men's professional tennis history. After a break from the pro circuit, Agénor made a comeback in 1999 becoming, at 35 years of age, the oldest player to reach top 100 (ATP ranked #88) in the world since Jimmy Connors did it in 1991. In 2000, he represented and led the Lido Luzern Tennis Club in Switzerland to its first Swiss National title in 100 years. In 2001, at 37 years of age, he finished the year ATP ranked #186 appearing in a final against David Nalbandian from Argentina.

Agénor retired from professional tennis in 2002 and opened the Ronald Agenor Tennis Academy in Los Angeles, California.

In 2009, he entered qualifying for the Genova Challenger in singles, but retired in the first round.

In 2012, Agénor entered the doubles draw of Futures events in Casablanca, Innisbrook, and Edwardsville. Partnering Takanyi Garanganga, he came up short in his final match.

ATP career finals

Singles: 8 (3 titles, 5 runner-ups)

Doubles: 2 (2 runner-ups)

ATP Challenger and ITF Futures finals

Singles: 15 (9–6)

Performance timelines

Singles

Doubles

After tennis
Agénor has also recorded music as a rock musician .

Agenor was once Honorary Consul of Haiti in Bordeaux, France (1989) and speaks several languages fluently. He is a member of the 'Champions for Peace' club, a group of high level sportsmen personally committed to the peace through sport movement, which is part of Peace and Sport, an organization under the patronage of  Prince Albert II of Monaco. In 1989, he was Honorary Consul of Haiti in Bordeaux, France. In 2006, the city of Castelnau de Médoc, in wine country region of Bordeaux in France, named its newly built tennis facility after Ronald "Salle Ronald Agénor". In 2018, he was inducted into the Black Tennis Hall of Fame in a ceremony held at George Washington University, in Washington DC, and the tennis court “Court Ronald Agénor” was inaugurated in the Bordeaux Wine region, at Sainte Terre Tennis Club, France.

References

External links 
 
 
 
 

1964 births
Living people
Haitian expatriate sportspeople in France
Haitian emigrants to the United States
Haitian male tennis players
Olympic tennis players of Haiti
Sportspeople from Beverly Hills, California

Tennis players from Bordeaux
Sportspeople from Rabat
Tennis people from California
Tennis players at the 1984 Summer Olympics
Tennis players at the 1988 Summer Olympics
Tennis players at the 1996 Summer Olympics
Central American and Caribbean Games medalists in tennis
Central American and Caribbean Games gold medalists for Haiti
Tennis players at the 1983 Pan American Games
Pan American Games competitors for Haiti